Sylla can refer to:

People

Basketball players
 Abdel Kader Sylla (born 1990), Seychelles basketball player

Football players
 Abdoul Karim Sylla (born 1981), Guinean football player
 Abdoul Karim Sylla (born 1992), Guinean-Dutch football player
 Abdoulaye Kapi Sylla (born 1982), Guinean football player 
 Kanfory Sylla (born 1980), Guinean football player
 Mohamed Ofei Sylla (born 1974), Guinean football midfielder
 Mohamed Sylla (footballer, born 1971), Guinean football striker
 Mohamed Sylla (footballer, born 1993), French footballmidfielder
 Mohammed Sylla (born 1977), Guinean footballer, also known as "Momo Sylla" (St. Johnstone, Celtic, Kilmarnock)
 Norman Sylla (born 1982), French football striker
 Salimo Sylla, French footballer
 Yacouba Sylla (born 1990), Malian-French midfielder who plays for KV Mechelen
 Issiaga Sylla (born 1994), Malian defender who plays for Toulouse

Volleyball players
 Miriam Sylla (born 1995), Ghanaian-Italian wing spiker/opposite playing for Imoco Volley and the Italian national team.

Entertainers and writers
 Assa Sylla (born 1996), French actress
 Ibrahim Sylla,  Sénégalease music producer
 Khady Sylla, (born 1963), Senegalese writer
 Mola Sylla (born 1956), Senegalese musician
 MHD (rapper) (Mohamed Sylla, born 1994), French musician

Politicians
 Fodé Sylla (born 1963), French politician
 Jacques Sylla (born 1946), Prime Minister of Madagascar
 Mamadou Sylla (politician) (born 1960), Guinean politician and business leader
 Talla Sylla, Senegalese politician

Other
 French name for Lucius Cornelius Sulla, a Roman general and statesman

See also
 Scilla (name)
 Scylla (disambiguation)
 Silla (name)
 Sillah
 Scylla
 Scilla
 Sulla